This is a list of Olympians who have won medals on numerous occasions in single events. Only Olympians with four or more medals in one event, or most medals in their sport, are included. If a person has contested for several nations, only the most recent nation is mentioned.

In those instances where two or more athletes have the same number of total medals, the first tiebreaker is the number of gold medals, followed by the number of silver medals. Where two or more athletes have exactly the same number of gold, silver and bronze medals, the ranking is shown as a tie and the athletes are shown in order by career years and name.

This list includes top-three placings in 1896 and 1900, even though these Games pre-dated the awarding of medals for top-three placings. Medals won in the 1906 Intercalated Games are not included.

Individual events

Notes

Team events

See also
List of multiple Olympic medalists
List of multiple Olympic medalists at a single Games
List of multiple Olympic gold medalists
List of multiple Olympic gold medalists at a single Games
List of multiple Olympic gold medalists in one event
List of multiple Summer Olympic medalists
List of multiple Winter Olympic medalists
List of athletes with the most appearances at Olympic Games
All-time Olympic Games medal table

References

 
 
 See also references in the articles on each athlete.

Olympic Games medal tables